Thingangyun Education College is a college in Yangon, Burma.

Universities and colleges in Yangon
Universities and colleges in Myanmar